Mesbahuddin Ahmed (born 31 October 1962) is a former Bangladeshi cricket umpire. He stood in one ODI game in 2002.

See also
 List of One Day International cricket umpires

References

1962 births
Living people
Bangladeshi One Day International cricket umpires
People from Dhaka